Doto floridicola is a species of sea slug, a nudibranch, a marine gastropod mollusc in the family Dotidae.

Distribution
This species was first described from the Azores. It has subsequently been reported from the UK and continental coasts south to Portugal and into the Mediterranean Sea.

Description
This nudibranch is translucent white with large red spots entirely covering the ceratal tubercles. The back and sides are covered with an irregular, patchy, brown-red pigment, and there are bare areas around the bases of the cerata and along the sides of the foot.

EcologyDoto floridicola feeds on the hydroid Aglaophenia kirchenpaueri'', family Aglaopheniidae.

References

Dotidae
Gastropods described in 1888